The Kreisliga Nordmain (English: District league North Main) was the highest association football league in parts of the German state of Hesse and the Prussian province of Hesse-Nassau from 1919 to 1923. The league was disbanded with the introduction of the Bezirksliga Main in 1923.

The league is named after the river Main, which flows through Frankfurt am Main and reaches the Rhine near Mainz. The league was formed from clubs from the northern side  of the river. With a club from Aschaffenburg, it also included a team from the Bavaria.

Overview

Predecessor
From 1907, four regional leagues were formed within the structure of the Southern German football championship, in a move to improve the organisation of football in Southern Germany, these being:
 Ostkreis-Liga, covering Bavaria
 Nordkreis-Liga, covering Hesse
 Südkreis-Liga, covering Württemberg, Baden and Alsace
 Westkreis-Liga, covering the Palatinate, Lorraine and the southern Rhine Province

In 1908, a first Nordkreis-Liga (English: Northern District League) was established, consisting of ten clubs and playing a home-and-away season. With the outbreak of the First World War, league football came to a halt and, during the war, games were only played on a limited level.

Post-First World War
With the collapse of the German Empire in 1918, no Nordkreis championship was played in 1918-19 but football returned to a more organised system in 1919.

Southern Germany, now without the Alsace region, which had to be returned to France, was sub-divided into ten Kreisligas, these being:
 Kreisliga Hessen      
 Kreisliga Nordbayern  
 Kreisliga Nordmain    
 Kreisliga Odenwald    
 Kreisliga Pfalz       
 Kreisliga Saar        
 Kreisliga Südbayern  
 Kreisliga Südmain     
 Kreisliga Südwest     
 Kreisliga Württemberg

The clubs of the former Nordkreis-Liga were split into three regional competitions, Nordmain, Südmain and Hessen, each with ten clubs. The three league winners advanced to the Southern championship. This system applied for the 1919–20 and 1920–21 season, except that Nordmain had eleven clubs in 1920–21.

In 1921–22, the Kreisliga Nordmain was split into two groups of eight, increasing the number of tier-one clubs in the region to 16. The two league winners then played a final to determine the Nordmain champion, which in turn advanced to a Main championship final against the Südmain champion. The Hessen champion was not part of this series but rather played a Rhinehesse/Saar championship. This "watering down" of football in the region lasted for only one season, in 1922–23, the number of top clubs was reduced to eight clubs in a single division, with a Main final against the Südmain champion once more.

In 1923, a league reform which was decided upon in Darmstadt, Hesse, established the Southern German Bezirksligas which were to replace the Kreisligas. The best four teams each from the Südmain and Nordmain were admitted to the new Bezirksliga Main. The four clubs from Nordmain were:
 FSV Frankfurt
 Helvetia Frankfurt
 Eintracht Frankfurt
 FC Hanau 93

National success
The clubs from the Kreisliga Nordmain were not particularly successful in this era and none managed to qualify for the German championship.

Main championship
Played in 1922 and 1923, these were the finals:
 1922:
 Nordmain final: Germania 94 Frankfurt - Eintracht Frankfurt 4-1 / 2-2
 Main final: Germania 94 Frankfurt - VfL Neu-Isenburg 1-0 / 0-3 / 4-2
 1923:
 Main final: FSV Frankfurt - Kickers Offenbach 0-1 / 7-2 / 2-1

Southern German championship
Qualified teams and their success:
 1920:
 Frankfurter FV, Group stage
 1921:
 Eintracht Frankfurt, Group stage
 1922:
 Germania 94 Frankfurt, Semi-finals
 1923:
 FSV Frankfurt, Group stage

Winners and runners-up of the Kreisliga Nordmain

Placings in the Kreisliga Nordmain 1919-23

 1 Frankfurter FV became Eintracht Frankfurt in 1920.
 2 Viktoria moved from the Kreisliga Odenwald to the Kreisliga Nordmain in 1920 and then to the Kreisliga Südmain in 1921.

References

Sources
 Fussball-Jahrbuch Deutschland  (8 vol.), Tables and results of the German tier-one leagues 1919–33, publisher: DSFS
 Kicker Almanach,  The yearbook on German football from Bundesliga to Oberliga, since 1937, published by the Kicker Sports Magazine
 Süddeutschlands Fussballgeschichte in Tabellenform 1897-1988  History of Southern German football in tables, publisher & author: Ludolf Hyll

External links
 The Gauligas  Das Deutsche Fussball Archiv 
 German league tables 1892-1933  Hirschi's Fussball seiten
 Germany - Championships 1902-1945 at RSSSF.com

1
1919 establishments in Germany
1923 disestablishments in Germany
Football competitions in Hesse
20th century in Hesse
Southern German football championship
Sports leagues established in 1919
Ger